Liam Mahoney (born December 13, 1987) is a professional Canadian football wide receiver who is currently a free agent. He was drafted 41st overall by the Winnipeg Blue Bombers in the 2011 CFL Draft, but was released during training camp. He subsequently signed with the Hamilton Tiger-Cats on July 25, 2011. He spent one season with the Tiger-Cats and eventually signed with the RedBlacks on February 28, 2014. He played CIS football for the Concordia Stingers. He was released by the Ottawa Redblacks on April 29, 2014.

References

External links
Ottawa Redblacks bio

1987 births
Living people
Canadian football wide receivers
Concordia Stingers football players
Hamilton Tiger-Cats players
Ottawa Redblacks players
People from Lachine, Quebec
Players of Canadian football from Quebec
Canadian football people from Montreal